Associação Brasileira de Educação a Distância (in Portuguese language, Brazilian Association of Distance Education) is a learned association founded in Brazil and headquartered in São Paulo, with the aim of promoting scientific interchange in the fields of distance education, e-learning and uses of technology in education, teaching, learning and training. Its founder and current president is Dr. Fredric Litto.

External links
 Official site

Distance education institutions based in Brazil